A War Against You is the fifth studio album by American melodic hardcore band Ignite. It was released on January 8, 2016, on Century Media Records. The album contains the hidden track "Falu" ("Village" in Hungarian), which is the Hungarian version of "Where I'm From".

It is Ignite's final album with long-time vocalist Zoltán "Zoli" Téglás, who left the band in 2020.

Track listing

Charts

References 

2016 albums
Century Media Records albums
Ignite (band) albums